Myotilin is a protein that in humans is encoded by the MYOT gene. Myotilin (myofibrillar titin-like protein) also known as TTID (TiTin Immunoglobulin Domain) is a muscle protein that is found within the Z-disc of sarcomeres.

Structure 
Myotilin is a 55.3 kDa protein composed of 496 amino acids. Myotilin was originally identified as a novel alpha-actinin binding partner with two Ig-like domains, that localized to the Z-disc. The I-type Ig-like domains reside at the C-terminal half, and are most homologous to Ig domains 2-3 of palladin and Ig domains 4-5 of myopalladin and more distantly related to Z-disc Ig domains 7 and 8 of titin. The C-terminal region hosts the binding sites for Z-band proteins, and 2 Ig domains are the site of homodimerization for myotilin. By contrast, the N-terminal part of myotilin is unique, consisting of a serine-rich region with no homology to known proteins. Several disease-associated mutations involve serine residues within the serine-rich domain. Myotilin expression in human tissues is mainly restricted to striated muscles and nerves. In muscles, myotilin is predominantly found within the Z-discs. Myotilin forms homodimers and binds alpha-actinin, actin, Filamin C, FATZ-1, FATZ-2 and ZASP.

Function
Myotilin is a structural protein that, along with titin and alpha-actinin give structural integrity to sarcomeres at Z-discs in striated muscle. Myotilin induces the formation of actin bundles in vitro and in non-muscle cells. A ternary complex myotilin/actin/alpha-actinin can be observed in vitro and actin bundles formed under these conditions appear more tightly packed than those induced by alpha-actinin alone. It was demonstrated that myotilin stabilizes F-actin by slowing down the disassembly rate. Ectopic overexpression of truncated myotilin causes the disruption of nascent myofibrils and the co-accumulation of myotilin and titin in amorphous cytoplasmic precipitates. In mature sarcomeres, wild-type myotilin colocalizes with alpha-actinin and Z-disc titin, showing the striated pattern typical of sarcomeric proteins. Targeted disruption of the myotilin gene in mice does not cause significant alterations in muscle function. On the other hand, transgenic mice with mutated myotilin develop muscle dystrophy.

Clinical significance
Myotilin is mutated in various forms of muscular dystrophy: Limb-Girdle Muscular Dystrophy type 1A (LGMD1A), Myofibrillar Myopathy (MFM), Spheroid Body Myopathy and Distal Myopath. The mechanism underlying the pathology is still under investigation. It has been shown that actin binding properties of myotilin housing pathogenic mutations (Ser55Phe, Thr57Ile, Ser60Cys, and Ser95Ile) are normal, albeit with a slower rate of degradation. Surprisingly, YFP-fusion constructs of myotilin mutants (Ser55Phe, Ser55Ile, Thr57Ile, Ser60Cys, Ser60Phe, Ser95Ile, Arg405Lys) localized normally to Z-discs and exhibited normal dynamics in muscle cells.

References

Further reading

External links
 
  GeneReviews/NIH/NCBI/UW entry on Myofibrillar Myopathy
 

Human proteins